American singer-songwriter Sufjan Stevens has released twelve studio albums (including three with additional artists), thirteen extended plays (EP), fifteen singles (including one as a featured artist), eight promotional singles, and eight music videos. Through his record label Asthmatic Kitty Records, Stevens released his first two albums A Sun Came and Enjoy Your Rabbit in 2000 and 2001, respectively. For his next two releases – Michigan (2003) and Seven Swans (2004) – the singer partnered with Sounds Familyre Records for the distribution of both releases. Seven Swans was supported by Stevens' debut single "The Dress Looks Nice on You". The same album was reissued in 2009 and included the new single "I Went Dancing with My Sister". His fifth album, Illinois, was his first release to enter record charts, where it reached the lower positions in several countries and was certified Gold by the Recording Industry Association of America for shipments of 500,000 copies. The Avalanche, a compilation album consisting of outtakes from Illinois, was released in 2006 and also reached various charts internationally.

The Age of Adz (2010) was promoted by singles "I Walked" and "Too Much", with the latter song peaking at number 42 on Billboards Rock Digital Song Sales component chart. The album itself debuted at number 7 on the Billboard 200, becoming Stevens' highest-peaking effort. As of March 2015, The Age of Adz has sold over 138,000 copies in the United States. In a collaborative effort with Bryce Dessner, Nico Muhly, and James McAlister, Stevens released Planetarium through 4AD Records in 2017. It was supported by singles "Saturn" and "Venus". Music videos were created for the two aforementioned songs in addition to album tracks "Mercury" and "Neptune".

He also embarked on a project titled "Songs for Christmas", where he released a series of ten EPs consisting of Christmas songs between December 2000 and December 2010. The first five releases were included on a box set titled Songs for Christmas (2006) while the final five were featured on a second one titled Silver & Gold (2012). Stevens contributed to the official soundtrack to the 2017 drama film Call Me by Your Name, where he provided original songs "Mystery of Love" and "Visions of Gideon". Both songs peaked on the charts in France and the United States, and the former song earned him an Academy Award nomination for Best Original Song.

Major releases

Studio albums

Compilation albums

Live albums

Soundtrack albums

Limited releases

Extended plays

Mixtapes

Singles

As lead artist

Promotional singles

Other charted songs

Other appearances

Guest appearances

Music videos

Notes

References

External links 
 
 
 

Alternative rock discographies
Discographies of American artists
Folk music discographies
Discography